The following is a list of wineries in the state of Idaho.

Table

Former wineries
The following is a list of wineries that have closed; this list is for tracking former locations.

See also
 Idaho wine
 List of American Viticultural Areas#Idaho
 List of breweries in Idaho
 Wine of the United States

References

External links
 Idaho Wine Commission

 
Agriculture in Idaho
Idaho-related lists
Idaho
Idaho
Food and drink in Idaho